Ilketshall St Andrew is a village and civil parish in the north of the English county of Suffolk. St Andrew's church is one of around 40 round-tower churches in Suffolk.

The parish had a population of 291 at the 2011 United Kingdom census. It is one of a group around Bungay known as The Saints, and is located east of the A144 road between Bungay and Halesworth. The parish borders the parishes of Shipmeadow, Ringsfield, Redisham, Westhall, Spexhall, Ilketshall St Lawrence and Ilketshall St John.

History 

In the 1870s John Marius Wilson's Imperial Gazetteer of England and Wales described Ilketshall St Andrew as:"Ilketshall St. Andrews, a parish in Wangford district, Suffolk; 4 miles SE of Bungay r. station. It has a postal letter box under Bungay. The property is much subdivided. The living is a vicarage in the diocese of Norwich. The church has an octangular tower, and is in good condition. There is a Wesleyan chapel."

Churches 
St Andrew's church is a round-tower church, dating from the 12th century. The church sits at a bend in School Road and has an octagonal shaped bell tower. In 1810 there was a screen between the body of the church and the chancel, which was destroyed in December 2001, which revealed a series of wall paintings. These paintings are similar to those found in St Botolph's, North Cove. The image depicts the theme of the 'Wheel of Fortune' and the unpredictable nature of human affairs. A crowned figure is found sitting on top of a wheel rotating it, to which humankind must follow the rotation. The rotation is circular, so a downturn in human affairs must be inevitably followed by an upturn.

A Methodist chapel was built in 1840 by the local Wesleyan Society, The chapel is a Grade II listed building, with a small garden at the front of the chapel. Worship at the chapel has now ceased.

Notes

References

Villages in Suffolk
Civil parishes in Suffolk
Waveney District
Round towers